Leisure class is an alternative term for upper class. It may also refer to

The Theory of the Leisure Class, seminal 1899 economics work
Leisure Class (band), American rock band
The Leisure Class, 2015 American film

See also
Old money
Gentry
Ruling class
Café society
Jet set
Leisure
The Idle Rich (disambiguation)